Thais can be the plural of Thai and refer to:
 The Thai people, the main ethnic group of Thailand
 The Thai peoples or Tai peoples, the ethnic groups of southern China and Southeast Asia

In the singular, Thais may refer to:

People

Ancient world
 Thaïs, a celebrated hetaira during the era of Alexander (356-323BCE)
 Thaïs (saint), 4th century repentant courtesan and saint of Roman Egypt

Modern world

 Thaís (footballer, born 1987), Brazilian footballer
 Thaís (footballer, born 1996), Brazilian footballer
 Thaisinha (born 1993), Brazilian footballer
 Thaís Picarte (born 1982), Brazilian football goalkeeper
 Thaís Fidélis (born 2001), Brazilian artistic gymnast
 Thais Weiller, Brazilian game designer and producer
 Thais Russomano (born 1963), Brazilian doctor and researcher
 Thais Souza Wiggers (born 1985), Brazilian television presenter and model
 Thaís de Campos (born 1956), Brazilian actress
 Thaís Melchior (born 1990), Brazilian actress
 Thaís Pacholek (born 1983), Brazilian actress
 Thaïs Blume (born 1984), Spanish actress
 Thaïs Henríquez (born 1982), Spanish synchronized swimmer
 Mayuka Thaïs (born 1979), American singer-songwriter, artist and actress
 Thais Blatnik (1919–2015), American journalist and politician
 Thais Lawton (1879–1956), American actress
 Thais St. Julien (1945–2019), American soprano

Arts and entertainment
 Thaïs (opera), an 1894 opera by Jules Massenet
 Thais (1917 American film), produced by Sam Goldwyn
 Thaïs (1917 Italian film), directed by Anton Giulio Bragaglia 
 Thais, a play by Menander
 Thaïs (novel), an 1890 novel by Anatole France
 The title character of Thais of Athens, a 1972 historical novel by Ivan Efremov
 Thaïs (painting), a 1781 painting by Joshua Reynolds
 "Thaïs", two songs by This Mortal Coil from the 1986 album Filigree & Shadow 
Thaïs, an Art Deco sculpture by Demétre Chiparus
 Thais, a fictional city in the video games Tibia (1997) and in Aveyond (2004)
 Thaïs Eulalia Kanellis, a character in the video game Black Closet

Other uses
 , two Royal Navy ships
 Thais (gastropod), a genus of gastropod mollusc
 1236 Thaïs, a main belt asteroid
 Thais (horse) (1893–1898), a British Thoroughbred racehorse and broodmare

See also
 Thai (disambiguation)